Gustavo Kuerten defeated Patrick Rafter in the final, 6–4, 7–5, 7–6(8–6) to win the men's singles tennis title at the 1999 Italian Open.

Marcelo Ríos was the defending champion, but lost in the first round to David Prinosil.

Seeds

Draw

Finals

Top half

Section 1

Section 2

Bottom half

Section 3

Section 4

References

Men's Singles